CBAF-FM-15 is a French language Canadian radio station located in Charlottetown, Prince Edward Island.

Owned and operated by the (government-owned) Canadian Broadcasting Corporation (French: Société Radio-Canada), it broadcasts on 88.1 MHz using a directional antenna with an average effective radiated power of 33,500 watts and a peak effective radiated power of 94,200 watts (class C).

The station has an ad-free news/talk format and is part of the Ici Radio-Canada Première network, which operates across Canada. Like all Première stations, but unlike most FM stations, it broadcasts in mono.

The station signed on sometime in the late 1970s as a rebroadcaster of CBAF in Moncton. On October 3, 1983, a first radio show was produced for the Island from Moncton (La marée de l'Île, hosted by Maurice Arsenault). In 1994, it officially became a separate station, though it still has rebroadcaster-like calls.

The station has its own morning drive show, produced in Charlottetown since September 1, 1996. Denis Duchesne is the host of Le Réveil, Monday to Friday from 6 to 9 a.m. The rest of its programming is a simulcast of CBAF-FM-5 from Halifax, Nova Scotia.

On November 21, 2005, the CRTC granted CBAF-FM-15 to operate rebroadcasters in St. Edward and Urbainville to serve areas on the fringe of the primary transmitter's signal.

CBAF-FM-15 was originally identified as CBAF-29-FM; the call sign change took effect on September 1, 1989, as the old 1300 kHz AM signal of CBAF was shut down.

Transmitters

Notes

External links
 Ici Radio-Canada Première
CBAF-FM-15 history - Canadian Communication Foundation

BAF-15
Baf
BAF-15
Year of establishment missing
1970s establishments in Prince Edward Island